Afrotridactylus is a genus of pygmy mole crickets, which contains the following species:

 Afrotridactylus ghesquierei Chopard, 1934
 Afrotridactylus koenigsmanni Günther, 1994
 Afrotridactylus madecassus (Saussure, 1896)
 Afrotridactylus meridianus Günther, 1994
 Afrotridactylus pallidus (Chopard & Callan, 1956)
 Afrotridactylus spiralatus Günther, 1994
 Afrotridactylus usambaricus (Sjöstedt, 1910) – African Sandhopper
 Afrotridactylus usambaricus alter Günther, 1994
 Afrotridactylus usambaricus usambaricus (Sjöstedt, 1910)

References 

Caelifera genera
Tridactylidae